Broadcast Film Critics Association Awards 2011 may refer to:

 16th Critics' Choice Awards, the sixteenth Critics' Choice Awards ceremony that took place in 2011
 17th Critics' Choice Awards, the seventeenth Critics' Choice Awards ceremony that took place in 2012 and which honored the best in film for 2011